Club Bàsquet Prat is a basketball team based in El Prat de Llobregat, Catalonia (Spain). The team currently plays in league LEB Oro.

History
Basketball arrived to El Prat de Llobregat in 1932 with the constitution of the Esplai Grupo 49 in the Federation of Young Christians of Catalonia. Basketball continued being played in the parish of Sant Pere i Sant Pau before 1951, when the Club Bàsquet Prat is founded.

The club started playing in the regional leagues until 1962, when the club achieves promotion the Spanish second division for the first time in its history; remaining in the league after their debut season, by winning the relegation playoffs.

In the 1990s the club signs a collaboration agreement with former EuroLeague winner Joventut Badalona, becoming its affiliated team and playing with the name of CB Prat Joventut.

In 2003, the club promotes to LEB Plata, third tier, by beating Colmenar Viejo and Granollers in the matches of the Final Eight.

Since its promotion, the club consolidated in LEB Plata until 2014, when it won the Copa LEB Plata and promoted to LEB Oro. In its first season, the club was relegated to LEB Plata again, but remained in the league after being reinstated due to the existence of vacant places.

In 2016, CB Prat terminated its collaboration agreement with Joventut Badalona. Two years later, the club qualified for the first time to the playoffs, where they reached the semifinals, being eliminated in the last match of the series by Club Melilla Baloncesto.

Players

Current roster

Depth chart

Season by season

Notable players

 Pau Ribas
 Guillem Vives
 Henk Norel
 Marko Todorović
 Christian Eyenga

Trophies and awards

Trophies
Copa LEB Plata: (1)
2014
Liga EBA: (1)
2006

Individual awards
LEB Plata MVP
Marko Todorović – 2012

External links
Official website

Catalan basketball teams
El Prat de Llobregat
LEB Oro teams
Former LEB Plata teams
Former Liga EBA teams